Vijayapur is a town in Devanahalli taluk and Bangalore Rural district in the Indian state of Karnataka. Vijayapura's old name is Vadigenahalli. Local villagers still refer Vijayapura as Vadigenahalli.

Geography
It has an average elevation of 883 metres (2896 feet).

Demographics
 India census, Vijayapura had a population of 29,458. Males constitute 52% of the population and females 48%. Vijayapura has an average literacy rate of 64%, higher than the national average of 59.5%: male literacy is 69%, and female literacy is 59%. In Vijayapura, 13% of the population is under 6 years of age.

Vijayapur was formerly known as Vadagenhalli, a corrupt form of veda-gaana-halli .

References

Cities and towns in Bangalore Rural district